Aleksandr Yefimovich Kurlyandsky (1 July 1938 – 21 December 2020) was a Soviet and Russian writer, satirist, playwright, screenwriter, and author of books for children. He was born and died in Moscow, and was an Honored Art Worker of the Russian Federation (2007). He was also awarded the USSR State Prize (1988).

He is the author of the scripts for the animated films Well, Just You Wait!, Baba Yaga is against!, and The Return of the Prodigal Parrot.

References

1938 births
2020 deaths
20th-century Russian dramatists and playwrights
20th-century Russian male writers
20th-century Russian screenwriters
Male screenwriters
21st-century Russian dramatists and playwrights
21st-century Russian male writers
21st-century Russian screenwriters
Writers from Moscow
Recipients of the USSR State Prize
Russian children's writers
Russian male dramatists and playwrights
Russian male writers
Russian satirists
Soviet children's writers
Soviet dramatists and playwrights
Soviet male writers
Soviet screenwriters
Deaths from cancer in Russia